Darryl Paa Kwesi Bannerman-Martin (born 20 August 1989), known under the stage name Joey B, is a Ghanaian hip hop recording artist. He is well known for his single "Tonga".

Early life and career
Joey B was born in Cape Coast, Ghana. He realized his talent for music at age six (6) when he formed a group and aided in ghost writing most of the songs they made together. This bolstered his unrelenting strong desire for music and pursued it. He had his primary education from St. Theresa's school and later went to Accra High School. He graduated at Zenith University College in 2016.

Later on, he collaborated with producer Lil Shaker till they met Jayso, the founder of Skillions. From then on, he has worked with various labels and producers such as Hammer of The Last Two and Black Avenue Music and produced many hit songs such as "Tonga", “Pinch mah Nips”, and "Strawberry". He was nominated the Hip-life/Hiphop Artist of the Year at the 2021 Vodafone Ghana Music Awards.

Collaborations and influences
On his career path, Joey B has collaborated with artistes such as Sarkodie, EL, Fuse ODG, Edem and many others. The rapper's music has been influenced by several artistes such as Kanye West and Kid Cudi.

In September, 2015, Roc Nation's rapper, Vic Mensa who was on a short trip to Ghana for his grandmother's funeral, disclosed he would love to work with Joey B and Sarkodie. The following year, Vic Mensa again on Beats 1 Radio interview with Ebro Darden, tipped listeners of possible collaborations with Joey B, Sarkodie and M.anifest.

Fashion style and brand ambassador for Adidas
In July 2015, world's eminent manufacturer of sports shoes, clothing and accessories; Adidas (Ghana) outdoor Joey B as their brand ambassador, making him the first in Africa.

Style influence
Joey B over the years has become not just a household name for mellow-vibe music but also his fashion style. His unique sense of fashion and great appeal to the youth has won him the most influential fashion icon in Ghana.

"Joey B's fashion style has grown so large that his other rappers cannot help it but to follow the trend.", an article on Ghana Web reported.

The rapper is well-noted for trendsetting skinny jeans and tattered clothing [preferably called fades and tatters] in Ghana.

Discography

EPs
LAVA FEELS (2020)
Darryl (2017)

Selected singles
"Ranger" feat. Darkovibes
"La Familia" feat. Sarkodie and Kwesi Arthur
"Green Tea" feat. Medikal
"Kiss & Tell"
"No Waste Time" feat. Boj
"Taya" feat. Darkovibes and RJZ
"Greetings From Abroad" feat. Pappy Kojo
"911" feat. Medikal
"Stables" feat. La Même Gang
You Peh Freestyle
Beautiful Boy feat. Wanlov and Ponobiom
Nsa (2018)
Sweetie Pie] feat. King Promise - (2018)
NewLords (feat Pappy Kojo and Sarkodie) (2017)
 Baby Mama (feat Sarkodie)(2017)
 Sunshine (2017)
 U x Me (2016)
 F.O.H (feat. Medikal) (2016)
 Otoolege (feat. Samini) (2015)
 Wow (feat. EL and Pappy Kojo) (2015)
 Tonga (feat. Sarkodie) (2014)
 Wave (feat. Pappy Kojo) (2014)
 Cigarette (2013)
 Strawberry Ginger (2013)
 Chop Kenkey (2013)
Akobam ft Medikal and Kofi Mole
 Cold (feat. Sarkodie) (2020)

Videography

Features
 "Medikal" La hustle ft Joey B ( Prod By DJ Krept)
 "Magnom" My Baby ft Joey B (Prod By MagNom)
 "G-West" Akosua ft Joey B (Prod By Kuvie)
 "EL" ft Joey B- You Don't Know Me
 "Mr Eazi" Ft Joey B - Holl'Up (Prod By Juls)
 "Vacs", ft Joey B – Enjoy (Prod. By Vacs)
 " Sarkodie "  ft. Joey B -Legend ( Prod. by Nova production)
 "Sarkodie", ft Joey B – Baby Mama (Prod. Ced Solo)

References

External links
 

1989 births
Living people
Ghanaian musicians
Ghanaian rappers
Ghanaian hip hop musicians
People from Cape Coast